Dar Derafsh may refer to:
Dar Derafsh-e Ebrahim Beygi
Dar Derafsh-e Khanomabad
Dar Derafsh-e Mohammad-e Amin Mirza
Dar Derafsh-e Qaleh
Dar Derafsh-e Seyyed Karim